John Davies may refer to:

Academics 
John Davies (archivist) (1925–1999), Malaysian archivist
John Davies (chemist) (died 1850), English chemist
John Davies (classical scholar, born 1679) (1679–1732), English classical scholar, and president of Queens' College, Cambridge
John Davies (historian) (1938–2015), Welsh historian
John Davies (librarian) (1743–1817), librarian of the University of Cambridge
John Davies (priest, born 1957), British Anglican priest and theologian
John Gordon Davies (1919–1990), British theologian
John K. Davies (astronomer) (born 1955), British astronomer
John K. Davies (historian) (born 1937), British classical historian

Businesspeople 
John Davies (British businessman) (1916–1979), businessman (British Petroleum) and Conservative MP and cabinet minister
John Davies (New Zealand businessman) (born 1941), businessman and mayor of Queenstown
John Davies (publisher) (1814–1872), co-founded the Australian newspaper The Mercury
John Henry Davies ( – 1927), brewery owner who in 1902 took over the British football club Manchester United
John T. Davies (businessman) (1881–1938), British businessman, director of the Suez Canal Company, and the Ford Motor Company Limited
John Wingett Davies (1908–1992), cinema operator and director of Davies and Newman
John Winsell Davies (born 1964), owner of the Schramsberg Vineyards

Film, radio, television, and theatre professionals 
John Davies (screenwriter) or Jack Davies (1913–1994), English screenwriter, producer and actor
John Graham Davies, Canadian-British actor
John Howard Davies (1939–2011), English television producer-director and former child actor
John S. Davies (actor) (born 1953), American actor

Judges 
John Davies (judge) (1898–1969), Chief Justice of Tanganyika (now Tanzania)
John Davies (swimmer) (1929–2020), United States district judge and Olympic swimmer for Australia
John T. Davies (politician) (born 1932), Minnesota politician, former legislator and jurist

Musicians 
John Davies (composer) (1787–1855), Welsh stone mason and composer
John Elias Davies (1847–1883), Welsh harpist
John Haydn Davies (1905–1991), Welsh schoolmaster and conductor
John R. T. Davies (1927–2004), remastering engineer of classic jazz recordings and musician

Politicians

Australasia 
John Davies (New South Wales politician) (1839–1896), Australian politician, NSW MLA (1874–87), MLC (1888–96)
John Mark Davies (1840–1919), British-born Australian politician in the state of Victoria, MLC (1889–1919)
John George Davies (1846–1913), Tasmanian politician, newspaper proprietor, and cricketer

United Kingdom 
John Davies (British businessman) (1916–1979), director-general of the Confederation of British Industry and Conservative MP and cabinet minister
John Davies (poet, born 1569) (1569–1626), poet, statesman, attorney-general in Ireland
John Davies (Welsh miners' agent) (died 1918), Welsh Liberal-Labour politician and trade unionist
John Davies, 1st Baron Darwen (1885–1950), British cotton manufacturer and Labour politician
John Cledwyn Davies (1869–1952), Welsh Liberal politician, educationist, and lawyer
John Lloyd Davies (1801–1860), Welsh lawyer and Conservative MP
John Quentin Davies (born 1944), British Labour MP

United States 
John C. Davies (lawyer) (1857–1925), New York State Attorney General, 1899–1902
John C. Davies II (1920–2002), US Representative from New York
John Paton Davies Jr. (1908–1999), American diplomat
John S. Davies (Pennsylvania politician) (1926–2010), Pennsylvania politician
John T. Davies (politician) (born 1932), Minnesota politician, former legislator and jurist

Religious leaders

Anglican clergypeople 
John Davies (archbishop of Wales) (born 1953), Archbishop of Wales from 2017 to 2021 and Bishop of Swansea and Brecon from 2008 to 2021
John Davies (archdeacon of Wrexham) (1908–1991), Welsh Anglican priest
John Davies (priest, born 1795) (1795–1861), Welsh Anglican priest and philosopher
John Davies (priest, born 1957), British Anglican priest and theologian
John Davies (bishop of St Asaph) (born 1943), Bishop of St Asaph from 1999 to 2008
John Davies (bishop of Shrewsbury) (born 1927), Bishop of Shrewsbury from 1987 to 1994
John David Davies (1831–1911), Welsh priest
John Llewelyn Davies (1826–1916), English preacher and theologian
John Rhys Davies (priest) (1890–1953), Anglican priest in Wales
John Thomas Davies (priest) (1881–1966), Anglican priest in Wales

Methodist ministers and missionaries 
John Davies (Methodist minister, born 1823) (1823–1874), Welsh Methodist minister
John Davies (missionary) (1772–1855), Welsh missionary and school teacher
John Davies of Nercwys (1799–1879), Welsh Calvinistic Methodist minister, preacher and writer
John Cadvan Davies (1846–1923), Welsh poet and Wesleyan Methodist minister
John Evan Davies (1850–1929), Welsh Calvinistic Methodist minister
John Gwynoro Davies (1855–1935), Welsh Methodist minister

Other religious leaders 
John Davies (Congregationalist minister, born 1804) (1804–1884), Welsh Congregationalist minister
John Davies (Unitarian minister, born 1795) (1795–1858), Welsh Unitarian minister and schoolmaster
John Ossian Davies (1851–1916), Welsh Congregationalist minister
John Park Davies (1879–1937), Welsh Unitarian minister

Sportspeople

Association footballers and football trainers 
John Davies (footballer, born 1856) (1856–1929), Wrexham A.F.C. and Wales international footballer
John Davies (footballer, born 1881), English footballer with Liverpool and Blackpool
John Davies (footballer, born 1933), footballer with Portsmouth, Scunthorpe United and Walsall
John Davies (footballer, born 1959), Welsh footballer with Cardiff City and Hull City
John Davies (footballer, born 1966), Scottish footballer with Clydebank, St. Johnstone, Airdrieonians, Ayr United and Motherwell
John Davies (goalkeeper), with Burslem Port Vale F.C. and Newton Heath F.C.
John Edward Davies (1862–1912), Oswestry F.C. and Wales international footballer
John Henry Davies (football trainer) or Jack Davies, British football trainer
John Price Davies (1862–1955), Druids F.C. and Wales international footballer

Rugby players 
John Davies (rugby, born 1941) (1941–1969), rugby union and rugby league footballer of the 1960s for Wales (RU), Neath, and Leeds (RL)
John Davies (rugby league, born 1991), current rugby league footballer for Castleford Tigers
John Davies (rugby union, born 1971), rugby union footballer of the 1990s and 2000s for Wales, Llanelli, and (Llanelli) Scarlets
John Leighton Davies (1927–1995), former rugby union and professional rugby league footballer

Swimmers 
John Davies (swimmer) (1929–2020), Olympic swimmer for Australia and later United States district judge
John Cecil Wright Davies or Jack Davies (1916–1997), New Zealand swimmer
John Goldup Davies (1914–1989), English swimmer

Other sportspeople 
John Davies (Australian footballer) (1943–86), Australian rules footballer for Geelong
John Davies (bowls), New Zealand Paralympic lawn bowler
John Davies (English cricketer) (born 1932), English cricketer
John Davies (ice hockey) (1928–2009), Canadian ice hockey player with the Edmonton Mercurys
John Davies (runner) (1938–2003), New Zealand middle-distance runner
John Davies (steeplechase runner) (born 1952), Welsh runner
John Davies (Welsh cricketer) (1926–2005), Welsh cricketer
John William Matthew Davies or Johnny Davies (1900–1967), Australian rules footballer for Carlton and Fitzroy

Other writers 
John Davies (grammarian) or Siôn Dafydd Rhys (1534 – ), Welsh physician and grammarian
John Davies of Hereford ( – 1618), Anglo-Welsh poet and satirist
John Davies (Mallwyd) ( – 1644), lexicographer, translator, and editor of the 1620 Welsh edition of the Bible
John Davies (poet, born 1569) (1569–1626), English poet, lawyer and politician
John Davies (translator) (1625–1693), Welsh translator and writer
John Davies (Taliesin Hiraethog) (1841–1894), Welsh poet
John Cadvan Davies (1846–1923), Welsh poet and Wesleyan Methodist minister
John Davies (poet, born 1944), Welsh poet
John Daniel Davies (1874–1948), Welsh editor and author
John Davies (author) (1868–1940), Welsh author
John Davies (bard) (died 1694), Welsh bard
John Davies (bibliographer and genealogist) (1860–1939), Welsh bibliographer and genealogist
John Davies (printer and journalist) (1832–1904), Welsh printer, editor, journalist, and song writer

Others 
John Davies (architect) (1796–1865), English architect
John Davies (photographer) (born 1949), landscape photographer based in the United Kingdom
John Humphreys Davies (1871–1926), Welsh lawyer, bibliographer and educator
John Thomas Davies (1895–1955), English recipient of the Victoria Cross

See also 
Jon Davie (born 1954), folk guitarist
Jonathan Davies (disambiguation)
Jonathan Davis (disambiguation)
John G. Davies (disambiguation)
John Davis (disambiguation)
John Davys (disambiguation)
John Davey (disambiguation)
John Davy (disambiguation)
Jack Davies (disambiguation)
John Davies Gilbert (1811–1854), land owner
John Rhys-Davies (born 1944), Welsh actor
John Langdon-Davies (1897–1971), British author and journalist